615 Music  is a broadcast production music company based in Nashville, Tennessee. Founded by Randy Wachtler.  615 Music composes television news music packages and custom image campaigns for many television networks around the world. 615 Music also operates in Los Angeles. The name 615 Music comes from  Nashville's Area Code (615), which is where the company is based.

The company composed the last three image campaigns for NBC's Today morning news/entertainment program: "Live for Today" (2005–2006), "It's a New Day" (2006–2007), and "Why I Love Today" (2008). The "Live for Today" theme was nominated for an Emmy. 615 Music also has a production music library.

The company, along with other composers of news music such as Gari Communications, have seen a surge in business since the third quarter of 2006. This is because licensing companies had raised the prices of licensing. In 2007, 615 Music signed a deal with Belo Corporation making them the exclusive provider of news music for the station group.

The company's music has also been licensed for use in movie trailers. Their track "Goth" was used in the domestic trailer for the critically acclaimed 2007 action film Live Free or Die Hard.

615 Music also produced the new official theme song for the Atlanta Braves, "The Braves Play Here" by James Otto.

On December 10, 2010, Warner Music Group announced its Warner/Chappell publishing division had acquired 615 Music.

See also 
 Trailer music

References

External links
615 Music website
Mass media companies established in 1985
1985 establishments in Tennessee
2009 mergers and acquisitions
Television production companies of the United States
Companies based in Nashville, Tennessee
Warner Music Group